Nickel mining in Western Australia has been an industry that has had many fluctuations of fortune in its history.  Large fluctuations in the world nickel price have seen mines close and reopen on several occasions.

Nickel mining is the sixth largest commodity sector in Western Australia with a value of A$4.946 billion in 2021–22. The 147,190 tonnes sold during this time period accounted for 5.5 percent of the world's Nickel production and 100 percent of all Nickel produced in Australia. The 2021–22 value of Nickel sales was the highest in 15 years while the amount produced was the lowest in 20 years.

From 1997 to 2022, Western Australia was the only state or territory in Australia to produce Nickel. With the restart of nickel concentrate production at the Avebury nickel project in Tasmania in October 2022, this status changed.

Australia (predominantly Western Australia) holds one-third of the world's known reserves of nickel-producing laterites and sulfide deposits.  As of 2011, Australia was the world's fifth largest nickel producer.  The only other significant Australian nickel production outside Western Australia is a refinery at Yabulu, Queensland which processes ore from New Caledonia, Indonesia, and the Philippines.

Cobalt is produced as a by-product in Western Australia nickel mines, producing 5,314 tonnes of Cobalt at a value of A$522 million in 2021–22.

Early mines

The first Nickel mines in Western Australia were developed in the late 1960s in Kambalda, Laverton and the Kimberley region of Western Australia.

The price of nickel peaked at about £7,000 per pound in late 1969, driven by demand from the Vietnam War and the major Canadian producer, Inco (now Vale Limited), being embroiled in industrial action, creating a supply shortage.  In November 1969, a prospector working for Poseidon NL made a promising nickel discovery at Mount Windara near Laverton.  The discovery created a spectacular investment bubble when its shares moved from $0.50 to $280 in February 1970.  

During the early 1970s, an exploration boom fueled by speculators followed, with new companies searching for new deposits. Western Mining Corporation (WMC) purchased Poseidon and developed the find into a major mining and processing operation which continued until 1989.  WMC had initially identified a total resource of 8.5 million tonnes of ore @ 2.02% Ni for 172,000 tonnes of nickel metal.  The first shipment of nickel concentrate was made in 1974, but by this time the nickel price had fallen significantly.  By 1990 the company had mined 5 million tonnes of ore at an average grade of 1.59% Ni and had produced 80,000 tonnes of the metal.  Operations at Windara re-commenced several times during the 1990s.  Several of the Kambalda mines have since been sold and the remainder are known the Windarra Nickel Project which, as of 2012 is under care and maintenance.

WMC was taken over by BHP Billiton and the company was delisted in 2005.

In 1971 the movie Nickel Queen was able to reflect upon the Poseidon bubble.

Nickel West

Nickel West is a division of BHP Billiton. In Western Australia, BHP Billiton's nickel operations are combined under the Nickel West Operation which includes Mount Keith Nickel Mine, Leinster Nickel Mine, Kambalda Nickel Concentrator, Kalgoorlie Nickel Smelter and Kwinana Nickel Refinery.

Production figures published by the company at the end of 2008 are for the whole Nickel West Operations and not broken down to individual mines. In the calendar year 2008 Nickel West produced 85,800 tonnes of nickel. At the time, Nickel West also included the Ravensthorpe Nickel Mine.

In 2012 there were press reports suggesting the operations may be divested.

Current mining operations 

The following companies operated Nickel mines in Western Australia in 2020–21, according to the Department of Mines, Industry Regulation and Safety. To qualify for the department's official list of principal mining projects an operation has to either had mineral sales valued at more than $5 million, or, for operations where such figures are not reported, had a minimum of 50 employees:

  The Nova Operations also produced 11,483 tonnes of cooper and 982 of cobalt
  Production figure is for the combined Nickel West Operations
  The Murrin Murrin Mine also produced 3,000 of cobalt
  Production at the Kambalda Nickel Operations commenced in 2022
  Production at the Savannah mine commenced in April 2022. The mine also produced 1,908 tonnes of cooper and 205 of cobalt

Nickel processing facilities
In 2020–21, BHP operates three processing facilities for Nickel in Western Australia, the Kalgoorlie Nickel Smelter, the Kambalda Nickel Concentrator and the Kwinana Nickel Refinery while Minara Resources operates the Murrin Murrin nickel refinery.

Former operations
Former operations include:

Fatalities
Fatalities in Western Australian nickel mining include:

Leinster Nickel Mine
During the development of the Leinster Nickel Mine, on 27 April 1977, five employees died at the mine's Perseverance shaft after falling 35 metres in an ore bucket.

In 1981, an employe was killed in an underground cave-in at the Leinster mine. On 11 December 1985, two men died of affixation in the underground operation of the mine, the second one dying while attempting to rescue the first. On 11 April 2010, a miner fell to his death at the mines underground operation.

Kwinana Nickel Refinery
On 9 June 1978, two employees were killed at the Kwinana Nickel Refinery, J. W. Bell and S. J. Haywood. Bell collapsed in a hazardous environment in a convertor vessel due to what is presumed to have been a faulty seal on his face mask. Haywood attempted to assist him and both died of asphyxiation, inhaling nitrogen gas.

Statistics
Annual statistics for the Western Australian nickel mining industry:

Notes

External links
 

 
Economy of Western Australia